When Zachary Beaver Came to Town is a 2003 American comedy-drama film directed by John Schultz and starring Jonathan Lipnicki and Cody Linley. It was adapted from a National Book Award-winning children's novel of the same name by Kimberly Willis Holt.

Plot
One summer in the small, sleepy town of Granger, Texas, Toby Wilson's life changes. Toby (Jonathan Lipnicki) is a boy who lives with his parents, but his mother runs off to Nashville to try to become a singer. Later, he and his best friend Cal McKnight (Cody Linley) meet a fat sideshow freak named Zachary Beaver (Sasha Neulinger), who has no parents or friends. Zachary, "The Fattest Boy Ever," spends most of his time in a small, silver trailer; he is abandoned by his legal guardian, Paulie Rankin, so [Paulie] can look for new additions to their circus. Toby and Cal get to know him, and slowly become friends with him.

They cope with the loss of Cal's brother, Wayne, who was recruited for the Vietnam War and later dies, leaving Cal devastated. Toby had been sending letters to Wayne pretending to be Cal until Wayne is killed, and Toby finally tells him this which leads to a fight between the two. Meanwhile, Toby is in Zachary's trailer during the funeral and Cal shows up. He gives Toby all the money he ever borrowed and tells him his mom is never coming back, just like Wayne. Later, Toby gives a country girl he likes a necklace, which was his mother's, but she gives it back to him because she likes someone else and doesn't like Toby that way. Earlier, Toby got to dance with her after her boyfriend broke up with her. Cal and Toby become friends after Toby chases him down to a lake soon after. In the end, they help Zachary get baptized in Gossimer Lake with the alcoholic preacher/cook owner of a local cafe, Ferris, who once studied to be a priest; later Paulie returns with circus performers to retrieve him. Zachary leaves town with them, and Cal and Toby's friendship is reaffirmed.

Production

In order to play the role of Toby, Jonathan Lipnicki attempted to gain the rights to the book when he was only ten years old, but was unsuccessful. He was later cast after he agreed to work with director John Schultz on the film Like Mike.

The film was shot in the cities of Austin and Granger in Texas.

Cast 
 Jonathan Lipnicki as Toby, a thirteen-year-old boy.
 Cody Linley as Cal
 Jesse Pennington as Wayne
 Sasha Joseph Neulinger as Zachary Beaver
 Jane Krakowski as Heather

References

External links 
 
 
 

2003 direct-to-video films
2003 comedy-drama films
2003 comedy films
2003 drama films
2003 films
2003 independent films
2000s children's comedy films
American direct-to-video films
American children's comedy films
American comedy-drama films
Children's comedy-drama films
2000s English-language films
Films based on American novels
Films based on children's books
Films directed by John Schultz (director)
Films scored by Richard Gibbs
Films set in Texas
Films shot in Texas
2000s American films